Lençóis is a municipality in the state of Bahia in Brazil. The population is 11,499 (2020 est.) in an area of 1277 km². The town has a well-preserved colonial atmosphere and is the starting point for treks into Chapada Diamantina. The city is served by Horácio de Mattos Airport.

References

External links

Municipalities in Bahia